Stoschiosaurus is an extinct genus of trematosaurian temnospondyl within the family Trematosauridae. It lived during the Early Triassic in what is now Greenland.

See also
 Prehistoric amphibian
 List of prehistoric amphibians

References

Lonchorhynchines
Fossil taxa described in 1935